Zenon Ważny (6 December 1929 – 23 October 2017) was a Polish pole vaulter. He was born in Wilno, Poland (now in Lithuania). He competed at the 1956 Summer Olympics in Melbourne, where he placed sixth in men's pole vault.

References

1929 births
2017 deaths
Sportspeople from Vilnius
People from Wilno Voivodeship (1926–1939)
Polish male pole vaulters
Olympic athletes of Poland
Athletes (track and field) at the 1952 Summer Olympics
Athletes (track and field) at the 1956 Summer Olympics